Avtar Singh may refer to following people:

 Autar Singh Paintal, Indian medical scientist
 Avtar Singh, Indian military soldier involved in the Jalil Andrabi murder case
 Avtar Singh (Punjabi politician), member (1980-1985) of the Punjab Legislative Assembly for the constituency of Talwandi Sabo
 Avtar Singh Atwal, Indian police officer, also known as A. S. Atwal
 Avtar Singh Bhadana, Indian politician
 Avtar Singh Cheema, first Indian to climb Mount Everest
 Avtar Singh Kang, Punjabi singer, also known as A. S. Kang 
 Avtar Singh Malhotra, Indian politician and independence activist 
 Avtar Singh Rikhy, Secretary General of the Lok Sabha
 Avtar Singh Sandhu, Punjabi poet, known by pen name Pash
 Awtar Singh, politician from Afghanistan
 Avtar Singh (judoka), Indian Olympic judoka 
 Avtar Singh Jouhl, British anti-racism campaigner